Zieria boolbunda is a plant in the citrus family Rutaceae and is only known from an area near Mount Perry in Queensland. It is a dense, compact shrub with wiry branches, three-part, clover-like leaves and pinkish-cream flowers in small groups, each flower with four petals and four stamens.

Description
It has wiry branches that are rough due to the remains of old leaf bases and are covered with warty glands. The leaves have a petiole  and are divided, clover-like into three leaflets. The leaflets are flat and there is a distinct midvein on the lower surface but otherwise the leaf veins are difficult to see.

The groups are about the same length or shorter than the leaves and usually only one to three flowers are open at the same time. The petals are dotted with clear glands and the outside is more or less hairy.

Taxonomy and naming
Zieria boolbunda was first formally described in 2007 by Marco Duretto and Paul Forster from a specimen collected on Boolbunda Rock near Mount Perry and Boolboonda in the Burnett district. The description was published in Austrobaileya and the specific epithet (boolbunda) refers to "the picturesque and imposing rock this species appears to be restricted to."

Distribution and habitat
This zieria grows in crevices in granite outcrops in woodland or heath above . Although it has a restricted distribution, the species appears to be locally common.

References

External links
 

boolbunda
Sapindales of Australia
Flora of Queensland
Taxa named by Marco Duretto
Plants described in 2007
Taxa named by Paul Irwin Forster